Antonio Calderón de León (1540–1621) was a Roman Catholic prelate who served as the first Bishop of Santa Cruz de la Sierra (1605–1621), 
Bishop of Panamá (1598–1605), 
and Bishop of Puerto Rico (1593–1598).

Biography
Antonio Calderón de León was born in Baeza, Spain.
On October 29, 1593, Pope Clement VIII, appointed him Bishop of Puerto Rico. 
In December 1597, he was consecrated bishop by Domingo de Ulloa, Bishop of Popayán. 
On May 23, 1598, Pope Clement VIII, appointed him Bishop of Panamá. 
On July 4, 1605, Pope Paul V, appointed him the first Bishop of Santa Cruz de la Sierra where he served until his death in 1621.

References

External links and additional sources
 (for Chronology of Bishops) 
 (for Chronology of Bishops) 
 (for Chronology of Bishops) 
 (for Chronology of Bishops) 
 (for Chronology of Bishops) 
 (for Chronology of Bishops) 

1540 births
1621 deaths
Bishops appointed by Pope Clement VIII
Bishops appointed by Pope Paul V
16th-century Roman Catholic bishops in Panama
People from Baeza
16th-century Roman Catholic bishops in Bolivia
16th-century Roman Catholic bishops in Puerto Rico
Roman Catholic bishops of Puerto Rico
Roman Catholic bishops of Panamá
Roman Catholic bishops of Santa Cruz de la Sierra